Mathilde Marchesi (née Graumann; 24 March 1821 – 17 November 1913) was a German mezzo-soprano, a singing teacher, and a proponent of the bel canto vocal method.

Biography
Marchesi was born in Frankfurt. Her father's last name was Graumann; her aunt was the pianist and friend of Beethoven, Dorothea von Ertmann (née Graumann). In her adolescence her family fortunes failed, so she travelled at the age of 22 to Vienna to study voice. Thereafter she went to Paris and studied with Manuel García II, who was to have the foremost influence on her. She made her debut as a singer in 1844, and had a short career in opera and recital. Her voice, however, was only adequate, so she moved to teaching in 1849. In 1852, she married Italian baritone Salvatore Marchesi (pseudonym of Salvatore de Castrone della Rajata) (d. 1908). 

It was in this field that she would become famous. She taught at the conservatory in Cologne and, in the 1870s at the Vienna Conservatory, where she tutored Marie Fillunger among others. Ultimately, she was best known as the vocal teacher of a number of great singers. The most famous among them is perhaps Nellie Melba, but she also trained such illustrious singers as Emma Calvé, Frances Alda, Ellen Gulbranson, Gertrude Auld Thomas, Selma Kurz and Emma Eames. Marchesi died in London in 1913. The mother of Joan Sutherland was taught by a pupil of Marchesi.

Today, Marchesi is remembered not at all for her singing career. Rather, she is known first and foremost as the teacher of a surprising number of great singers, and also as the person who carried the bel canto technique into the 20th century. Her ideas are still studied, primarily by female singers, especially those with voices in the soprano range, in which Marchesi had specialized.

Teachings

Marchesi was clearly committed to the bel canto style of singing. Despite this, she did not particularly identify herself as a bel canto teacher. She asserted that there were only two styles of singing: "the good...and the bad" and argued that a properly trained vocalist could sing the old bel canto style just as easily as the then newer, more dramatic style.

She was generally an advocate of a naturalistic style of singing:  she called for a fairly instinctive method of breathing and argued against the "smiling" mouth position that many teachers of her day preferred. She was particularly concerned with vocal registration, calling it "the Alpha and Omega of the formation and development of the female voice, the touchstone of all singing methods, old and new." She also repeatedly expressed disdain for the teachers of her day who offered methods that they asserted would fully develop the voice in only a year or two. Instead, she felt that vocal training was best approached at a slow and deliberate pace.

Two of the most distinctive features of her teachings were her "analytical method" and her insistence on very short practice times for beginners. Her "analytical method" placed great importance on intellectually understanding both the technical and the aesthetic nature of everything sung, from grand arias to simple vocal exercises. She argued that rote practice without understanding was ultimately harmful to the artistic use of the voice. Most distinctively, though, she insisted on very short practice times for beginners, as little as five minutes at a stretch three or four times a day for absolute beginners. Of course, as the voice matured those times could and should be expanded.

Pupils
Among her pupils were:

 Suzanne Adams
 Frances Alda
 Sigrid Arnoldson
 Blanche Arral
 Kate Bensberg
 Nadina Bulcioff
 Emma Calvé
 Ada Crossley
 Ilma de Murska
 May De Sousa
 Marie Duma
 Emma Eames
 Emma Engdahl-Jägerskiöld
 Rose Ettinger
 Ethel Fiske
 Antonietta Fricci
 Marie Fillunger
 Mary Garden
 Etelka Gerster
 Louise Johnson-Missievitch
 Jeanne Jomelli
 Božena Kacerovská
 Mai Kalna
 Katharina Klafsky
 Gabrielle Krauss
 Selma Kurz
 Miriam Licette
 Estelle Liebling
 Blanche Marchesi (her daughter)
 Dame Nellie Melba
 Yevgeniya Mravina
 Louise Natali-Graham
 Emma Nevada
 Aglaja Orgeni
 Gina Oselio
 Regina Pacini
 Rosa Papier
 Anna Pessiak-Schmerling
 Marta Petrini
 Sedohr Rhodes
 Louise Rieger
 Sarah Robinson-Duff
Elyda Russell
 Caroline Salla
 Sibyl Sanderson
 Frances Saville
 Evelyn Scotney
 Nadina Slaviansky
 Georgina Stirling
 Maggie Stirling
 Florence Toronta
 Guillaume Tremelli
 Florence Turner-Maley
 Inez McCune Williamson
 Ellen Beach Yaw
 Nadezhda Zabela-Vrubel

(Some pupils were noted on an 1899 dedicatory poster, Anniversary Fete – fifty years professorship, Mathilde Marchesi, 1849–1899).

Family
Her daughter, Blanche Marchesi (1863–1940), a contralto, also a noted singer and teacher, made her début at a young age. She first appeared in opera at Prague in 1900, and subsequently sang at Covent Garden in 1902 and 1903. She was an admired concert singer.

Notes

References
 Marchesi, Mathilde. Bel Canto: A Theoretical and Practical Vocal Method. Dover (1970). 
 Marchesi, Mathilde. Marchesi and Music: Passages from the Life of a Famous Singing Teacher.  New York ; London : Harper & Bros. Publishers, 1898.
 Marchesi, Mathilde. Ten Singing Lessons. Preface by Madame Melba, introduction by W. J. Henderson.  New York ; London : Harper, 1901.

 Somerset-Ward, Richard. Angels & Monsters: Male and Female Sopranos in the Story of Opera, (Chapter 10, "Marchesi's Pupils"). New Haven ; London : Yale University Press, 2004.

External links
 The Marchesi Collection contains many papers of Mathilde Marchesi, in the Music Division of The New York Public Library for the Performing Arts
 
 Madame Marchesi – Some of Her Teaching Principles, from The Etude Magazine, April, 1904.
 Truths for Singing Teachers and Students, by Mme. Mathilde Marchesi, from The Etude Magazine, October, 1913.

1821 births
1913 deaths
19th-century German women singers
German operatic mezzo-sopranos
Voice teachers
Vocal coaches
Pupils of Manuel García (baritone)
German emigrants to the United Kingdom
Musicians from Frankfurt
Women music educators